Leva is the debut studio album by Swedish singer Elisa Lindström.

Track listing
"Leva"
"Casanova"
"Ingen tar min man"
"Tack för lånet"
"Du gör mig galen"
"Lillasyster"
"Broarna brinner"
"Illusion"
"Flickan i spegeln"
"Det känns så nu"
"Ingenting annat än dig"
"Om du fick va för alltid"

Charts

References 

2014 debut albums
Elisa Lindström albums
Swedish-language albums